Events from the year 1894 in Sweden

Incumbents
 Monarch – Oscar II
 Prime Minister – Erik Gustaf Boström.

Events

11 March - GAIS is founded
3 December: The Church of Sweden Umeå City Church is inaugurated on First Advent Sunday.
Date unknown - Kata Dalström is engaged as a lecturer for the Socialists
Date unknown - Svartviks IF is established

Births
 1 January - Aurora Nilsson, writer (died 1972)
21 March – Hannah Ryggen, textile artist (died 1970).
 6 July – Edmund Lindmark, gymnast (died 1968).
 9 October - Agnes von Krusenstjerna, writer (died 1940)

Deaths

 22 October – Gillis Bildt, politician (born 1820)
 - Peggy Hård, first woman clerk (born 1825)
 - Gumman Strömberg, fish seller, local profile (born 1830)
 7 May - Marie Sophie Schwartz, writer (born 1819)
 28 January - Elise Hwasser, actress (born 1831)

References

 
Sweden
Years of the 19th century in Sweden